George W. Bush, the 43rd president of the United States, has received numerous honors in recognition of his career in politics. These include:

National honors

Foreign honors

Scholastic

Honorary degrees

Awards

Freedom of the City
  30 August 2018: Vilnius.

Namesakes
George W. Bush Elementary School, Stockton, California
George W. Bush Elementary School, St. Paul, Texas
George W. Bush Street, Tbilisi, Georgia

References

Bush, George W.
Awards and honors